Pierce LePage (born January 22, 1996) is a Canadian track athlete who competes in the decathlon. He is the 2022 World silver medalist, 2018 Commonwealth silver medalist, and 2019 Pan American bronze medalist. LePage represented Canada at the 2020 Summer Olympics, finishing in fifth place.

Career
Starting track and field at the age of 12 and the decathlon at the age of 17, LePage emerged as a star athlete in 2015 after breaking the Canadian junior decathlon record. LePage then gained funding through the RBC Training Ground talent identification program in 2016. That same year he attended the Décastar meet, and scored above 8000 points for the first time. In 2017, LePage attended the Hypo-Meeting for the first time, finishing in seventeenth position, and then won the NACAC Combined Events Championships. Domestically, he won the decathlon event at the 2017 Canadian Track and Field Championships, albeit in the absence of then-reigning Olympic bronze medalist Damian Warner.

LePage was named to the Canadian team for the 2018 Commonwealth Games taking place in Gold Coast, Australia. In his first major championship appearance, he unexpectedly drew major media attention in his home country when teammate Warner, who led the event until midway through the second day, was triple-faulted in the pole vault and withdrew from the event. LePage then became the focus of the country's medal hopes and scored a personal best 8,171 points to win the silver medal behind Lindon Victor of Grenada. After his podium finish, LePage said that "for me, this is a huge stepping stone going from local competitions to a big event like the Commonwealth Games." He credited Warner for his support, calling him "someone to talk to, lean on if you need help and at Commonwealth he was helpful — I probably couldn't have a won a silver medal without him there because he's a great leader by example." However, the remainder of his season was derailed by UCL and hamstring injuries, the latter sustained in an attempted comeback at the Décastar.

In June of the 2019 season, LePage scored 8453 points to win the Décastar meeting in Talence, France, obtaining the qualifying standard for both the Olympics and World Championships. Named to the Canadian team for the 2019 Pan American Games in Lima alongside Warner, he was second in the standings after the first day of competition, with Warner in first. He dropped to third on the second day, surpassed by Grenada's Victor, and won the bronze medal. LePage noted that he was dealing with a knee injury he had incurred at the national championships earlier. He then made his World Championship debut at the 2019 edition in Doha, and finished fifth in the decathlon event with a score of 8445. As at the Pan American Games, he was in second place after the first day but ultimately dropped off the podium in the final two events, the javelin throw and the 1500 metres. He admitted afterward to being "a bit frustrated because of so many things that could've gone much better, but it's my first world championships, so what can you do." His high scores across the season lead to his placing third in the seasonal IAAF Combined Events Challenge.

Due to the onset of the COVID-19 pandemic, the 2020 Summer Olympics in Tokyo were delayed by a full year, and training became difficult with many facilities shut down. LePage noted that he was "training in a random field outside my house for about a year. Just running. I didn't pole vault for a year, didn’t do high jump, long jump." LePage was named to his first Olympic team when the time came. Prior to the Games he participated in the 2021 Hypo-Meeting and won the silver medal behind Warner, setting new personal bests in the 100 metres, the 110 metres hurdles, and 1500 metres. Competing in Tokyo, LePage was in third place after the first day of the decathlon, though he noted that he was "going through some stuff" that impacted his ability to do the high jump. A year later he would later reveal that he had been competing through a torn patella tendon, saying "I don't like having excuses. It was an experience I will never forget, and I learned from it." He ultimately finished in fifth place.

LePage attended the 2022 Hypo-Meeting but only participated in the 100 metres and the long jump before withdrawing. At the 2022 World Athletics Championships, LePage finished the first day of the decathlon in second place, after Warner was forced to withdraw because of a hamstring injury. On the second day, consecutive personal best performances in the hurdles and discus throw briefly elevated him into first place, but he was passed by Frenchman Kevin Mayer after the javelin and won the silver medal with a personal best score of 8701 points. On his podium finish, LePage noted that he had "always been high in the standings and then drop off near the end, and it was so much disappointment. To finally be on top, to stay on the podium is amazing." LePage was initially named to the Canadian team for the 2022 Commonwealth Games, but withdrew after the World Championships, with Athletics Canada citing a need "to properly recover and prepare for the rest of the season."

Personal bests (outdoor)

References

Sources

 Damian Warner leads decathlon after 100m, Pierce LePage in 2nd
 Pierce LePage leads decathlon after long jump
 LePage happy with decathlon finish at track and field worlds

External links
 

1996 births
Canadian decathletes
Living people
Athletes (track and field) at the 2018 Commonwealth Games
Sportspeople from Whitby, Ontario
Commonwealth Games silver medallists for Canada
Commonwealth Games medallists in athletics
Athletes (track and field) at the 2019 Pan American Games
Pan American Games bronze medalists for Canada
Pan American Games medalists in athletics (track and field)
Pan American Games track and field athletes for Canada
Medalists at the 2019 Pan American Games
Athletes (track and field) at the 2020 Summer Olympics
Olympic track and field athletes of Canada
World Athletics Championships medalists
Medallists at the 2018 Commonwealth Games